Phosphazenes refer to classes of organophosphorus compounds featuring phosphorus(V) with a double bond between P and N. One class of phosphazenes have the formula . These phosphazenes are also known as iminophosphoranes and phosphine imides. They are superbases. Another class of compounds called phosphazenes are represented with the formula , where X = halogen, alkoxy group, amide and other organyl groups. One example is hexachlorocyclotriphosphazene . Bis(triphenylphosphine)iminium chloride is also referred to as a phosphazene, where Ph = phenyl group. This article focuses on those phosphazenes with the formula .

Phosphazene bases

Phosphazene bases are strong non-metallic non-ionic and low-nucleophilic bases. They are stronger bases than regular amine or amidine bases. Protonation takes place at a doubly bonded nitrogen atom. Related to phosphazene bases are the Verkade bases, which feature P(III) with three amido substituents and a transannular amine. These are the highest pKa measured for the conjugate acid of charge-neutral molecular base.

Phosphazene bases are established reagents in organic synthesis. Most notably, they have been used as catalysts in the synthesis of poly(phthalaldehyde) polymer. Perhaps the best known phosphazene bases are BEMP with an acetonitrile pKa of the conjugate acid of 27.6 and the phosphorimidic triamide t-Bu-P4 (pKBH+ = 42.7) also known as Schwesinger base after one of its inventors.

In one application t-Bu-P4 is employed in a nucleophilic addition converting the pivaldehyde to the alcohol:

The active nucleophile is believed to be a highly reactive phosphazenium species with full negative charge on the arene sp2 carbon.

Besides organic synthesis, phosphazene bases are used as basic titrants in non-aqueous acid–base titration. Their advantages for this are: they are very strong bases in many solvents and their conjugate acids are inert and non-HBD cations.

See also
Cyclodiphosphazane
Hexachlorophosphazene
Polyphosphazene

References

Nitrogen compounds
Phosphorus compounds
Non-nucleophilic bases
Superbases